David Cespiva (born November 5, 1986) is a German professional ice hockey player who is currently an Unrestricted Free Agent. He most recently played for EHC München in the Deutsche Eishockey Liga (DEL). He joined München on a one-year contract from Adler Mannheim on May 6, 2011.

Career statistics

Regular season and playoffs

International

References

External links

1986 births
Adler Mannheim players
Krefeld Pinguine players
Living people
EHC München players
Nürnberg Ice Tigers players
German ice hockey defencemen
Sportspeople from Duisburg